Zbigniew Malicki (born 9 September 1944) is a Polish sailor. He competed in the Star event at the 1980 Summer Olympics.

References

External links
 

1944 births
Living people
Polish male sailors (sport)
Olympic sailors of Poland
Sailors at the 1980 Summer Olympics – Star
People from Minden
Sportspeople from Detmold (region)